The 2013 Big 12 Conference football season will be the 18th season for the Big 12, as part of the 2013 NCAA Division I FBS football season.

Preseason

Big 12 Media Preseason Poll

() first place votes

Preseason All-Big 12
2012 Pre-season Coaches All-Big 12

Rankings

Head coaches
	

 Art Briles, Baylor	
 Paul Rhoads, Iowa State	
 Charlie Weis, Kansas
 Bill Snyder, Kansas State	
 Bob Stoops, Oklahoma	
	
 Mike Gundy, Oklahoma State
 Gary Patterson, TCU
 Mack Brown, Texas
 Kliff Kingsbury, Texas Tech	
 Dana Holgorsen, West Virginia

Schedule

Week one

Week two

Week three

Week four

Week five

Week six

Week seven

Week eight

Week nine

Week ten

Week eleven

Week twelve

Week thirteen

Week fourteen

Week fifteen

Post-Season

Bowl Games

BCS Bowl Games

Awards and honors

National Awards
None

Consensus All-Americans

Tight End
 Jace Amaro, Texas Tech
Offensive Line
 Gabe Ikard, Oklahoma
 Cyril Richardson, Baylor
Defensive Line
 Jackson Jeffcoat, Texas
Defensive Back
 Ahmad Dixon, Baylor
 Justin Gilbert, Oklahoma State
 Jason Verrett, TCU
Kicker
 Anthony Fera, Texas

All-Big 12 Individual Awards

Offensive Player of the Year: Bryce Petty, Baylor
Co-Defensive Players of the Year: Jackson Jeffcoat, Texas; Jason Verrett, TCU
Offensive Newcomer of the Year: Charles Sims, West Virginia
Defensive Newcomer of the Year: Isaiah Johnson, Kansas
Offensive Freshman of the Year: Baker Mayfield, Texas Tech
Defensive Freshman of the Year: Dominique Alexander, Oklahoma
Offensive Lineman of the Year: Cyril Richardson, Baylor
Defensive Lineman of the Year: Ryan Mueller, Kansas State
Special Teams Player of the Year: Tyler Lockett, Kansas State
Chuck Neinas Coach of the Year: Art Briles, Baylor

All-Big 12 Teams

The Big 12 Conference coaches voted for the All-Big 12 teams after the regular season concluded.

Coaches were not permitted to vote for their own players.

2014 NFL Draft

N.B: In the explanations below, (D) denotes trades that took place during the 2014 Draft, while (PD) indicates trades completed pre-draft.

Round one

Round two

Round three

Round four

Round five

Round six

Round seven

Trade references

References